Seven Knights is a series of online free-to-play role-playing game created by Netmarble. The first game was released for Android and iOS devices in March 2014 in South Korea and in February 2016 worldwide. A realistic sequel mobile game Seven Knights 2 was released in November 2020, in addition to having a Microsoft Windows version's beta was released a month later in 2021 before the version's full release. A massively multiplayer online role-playing game game Seven Knights Revolution was released in South Korea in July 2022.

An anime television series adaptation by Liden Films and DOMERICA titled Seven Knights Revolution: Hero Successor aired from April 5 to June 21, 2021.

A remake version of the first game, The Seven Knights was announced on March 2, 2023, after the announcement of service termination of the first game global services. Follow the same story line of the frist game, but change main character view to Four Emperror Lord, Ace. It was built on lastest version of Unreal Engine 5, with using same character design and pixel shadder of Seven Knight Revolution. It was plan to launch in South Korea on Q4 2023. This is a result of a remaster version of the first game that Netmarble Nexus was announced on 2022.

Anime Premise 
Long ago, the evil goddess Nestra and her cult, Physis, attempted to destroy the world until they were stopped by the Seven Knights, warriors chosen by the goddess Serrass. Generations later, the Seven Knights are worshipped as heroes by Granseed Academy, an institution that trains the next generation of warriors. Granseed's student council is the next generation of Seven Knights, and they channel the power of the original heroes through the process of Succession, which bonds the soul of the current hero with the soul of the original hero with a special card. This new generation of Seven Knights enters into conflict with Physis, which is spreading its influence throughout the world yet again.

Characters

 Member of the original Seven Knights. She gifts Shirley with the power of fire.

 Member of the original Seven Knights. She gifts Joe with the power of ice.

 Controller of time and member of the original Seven Knights. She gifts Eren with the ability to predict the future and manipulate the flow of time.

 A dragon knight and member of the original Seven Knights. He gifts Gildan with a suit of draconic armor.

 The Dark Ruler and member of the original Seven Knights. He gifts Gales with a sword with the power of darkness.

Anime Exclusives

 The protagonist of the series. A polite and humble boy who is the sole survivor from Ulley Village, which was destroyed by Physis-infected monsters. He is inducted into Granseed Academy by Faria after she saves his life and he bonds with the soul of a Knight, who is later revealed to be Jenius. He is later revealed to be a homunculus created by Amis Germain in an attempt to turn him into the Son of Destruction, destined to bring about the arrival of the God of Destruction. However, the spirit of Jenius inspired the homunculus to escape to a human town, where he killed a boy named Nemo, assumed his form and stole his memories. He is lethally injured by a corrupted Gales but Eren saves his life and he is visited by the spirit of the original Nemo, who forgives him for his own death and motivates him to protect the people he cares about. His weapon is a grappling hook connected to a blade, which he can turn into Jenius' most powerful weapon, the Legis Breaker, an energy cannon with enormous destructive power. In his final battle with Sophitia, he remembers that the original Nemo actually sacrificed his life to save him, and the homunculus devoured him and assumed his form as a way to honor him. He and Jenius combine the last of their powers to recreate the Book of Time and trap Sophitia and the powers of darkness within it yet again, at the cost of completely extinguishing Jenius' soul and rendering Nemo a powerless human. Even without his powers, though, Nemo decides to remain by Faria's side and they embark on a journey in order to find a way to destroy the Book of Time and prevent its misuse. 

President of Granseed Academy's student council and leader of the new Seven Knights. Her soul is bonded to that of her ancestor, Yunomia, one of the original Seven Knights. Her weapon is a double-bladed axe. She saves Nemo's life and welcomes him to Granseed to begin his training as a warrior. She is very serious and dedicated to her work, but she is can also be friendly and warm whenever she isn't concerned with her duty. Her feelings for Nemo grow to the point that she is willing to risk her own life to prevent his execution, based on false evidence. She becomes infected by the power of destruction sealed within Granseed's old library in her attempts to save Nemo, but she doesn't care, as she has decided to protect Nemo by her own free will. She helps Nemo fight Sophitia, the true leader of Physis, and bears witness at how Nemo recreates the Book of Time and traps Sophitia within it, at the cost of losing his Succession powers. With the dark power sealed, Faria is freed from her curse and she reaffirms her desire to stay by Nemo's side. She resigns her position at Granseed and joins Nemo in a journey in order to find a way to destroy the Book of Time and prevent its misuse.

 Faria's personal valet and member of the new Seven Knights. Her soul is bonded to that of Vanessa and she has the power to predict the future and manipulate the flow of time. Since childhood, she had trouble making friends before meeting Faria because she unwittingly predicted their deaths, to the point she believes she predicted the date of the end of the world, as she could no longer see the future beyond that point. She knows that Shirley is a vampire and has been allowing her to drink her blood in order to satiate her thirst. In the battle against Amis Germain, she nullifies his powers using temporal magic, a feat that leaves her physically exhausted. Fortunately, she had safeguarded a portion of the sand used by the silver hourglasses, mystical artifacts that can control the flow of time, and uses it to save Nemo's life, but this act nearly kills her and in order to save her, Shirley turns Eren into a vampire.

 An elf from the Winswald clan and member of the new Seven Knights. His home was destroyed by Physis, making him very determined into exterminating them. Despite his stoic personality, he genuinely appreciates his friends and does whatever he can to help them. He tries to investigate Granseed's old library, believing it to be connected to Physis in some way, but inadvertently gets his schoolmate Claire killed. Guilt-ridden, he promises to hunt down her killer. While his fellow Knights attack Physis' main fortress, Gales investigates Granseed's old academy and finds it infested with Physis monsters. After defeating the monsters, he receives information from Sophitia about the old library. Upon learning about Nemo's origins, he orders his arrest and even becomes tempted to kill him but ultimately decides to his wait to be decided by the proper judgment. Unfortunately, the dark power sealed within the old library threatens to cause a global disturbance, causing an enraged Gales to ask Sophitia to give him the power to kill Nemo, believing him to be the cause of the disaster. Gales becomes corrupted by Sophitia's power and lethally injures Nemo before being seemingly killed by Sophitia herself. Thanks to his powers over darkness, however, Gales survives and helps his fellow Knights defeat Sophitia and defend Granseed as a form of atonement for his previous betrayal. After the final battle, he makes a full recovery and rejoins his friends.

 Member of the Seven Knights, bonded to the soul of Spike. He is obsessed with physical strength and constantly trains to become strong after his father died fighting Physis-infected monsters. He has a crush on Sophitia, who seduces him in an attempt to use him for her goals. He is corrupted by Sophitia's power, forcing Gildan to fight him. Fortunately, Gidan is able to bring him back to his senses and Joe helps in the defense of Granseed against Sophitia.

 A prince of a country populated by beastmen and member of the Seven Knights, bonded to the soul of Jave. On a training session, his succession goes badly and he is consumed by his own draconic armor until he is saved by the combined efforts of Nemo, Jou, and Gales. Grateful, Gales becomes a firm ally to Nemo, refusing to believe he works for Physis and attempting to vouch for his innocence. When Reda reveals that Sophitia is part of Physis, Gildan is forced to fight Joe, who has been corrupted by Sophitia's power. Fortunately, he is able to bring Joe back to his senses and both help in defending the school against Sophitia's destructive power.

 President of Granseed's disciplinary board and member of the Seven Knights, bonded to the soul of Rachel Agni. She is a vampire hailing from a family of pacifists that never harmed humans. Unfortunately, her family was killed and she was forced to escape to Granseed for her own safety. Only Ellen and Nemo know about her true identity and allow her to drink their blood as a form of friendship. Shirley is later implied to develop feelings for Eren beyond the need to drink her blood. Her weapon is a rapier. Although vampires are naturally vulnerable to fire, Shirley developed some resistance to it thanks to her bond with Rachel. When Nemo's true identity as a homunculus is revealed, she is conflicted about her feelings on the matter until she decides to help Gildan vouch for Nemo's innocence. When Reda reveals that Sophitia is part of Physis, she agrees to take part in the effort to stop Sophitia. She is aware of Eren's time magic and that it drains her life force every time she uses it, so she makes Eren drink a portion of her blood to turn her into a vampire and save her life.

 Member of the original Seven Knights. He bonded his soul to Nemo, granting him a suit of armor equipped with a hook-blade and an energy cannon. According to legend, Jenius sold his soul to Physis and set Granseed's old library on fire before being killed by Yunomia, but this was a fabrication. In reality, Jenius created the Book of Time, a special seal around the library to prevent the power of destruction from spreading across the world, and only allowed the lies about him to be remembered because the book's seal was imperfect. His spirit endured, however, and inspired the homunculus Nemo to escape from Amis Germain's base. For the most part, Jenius does not speak freely to Nemo, only speaking him during critical moments. In the final battle against Sophitia, the true leader of Physis, he and Nemo combine the last of their power to recreate the Book of Time, at the cost of completely extinguishing Jenius' spirit.

 Member of the original Seven Knights and Faria's ancestor. She gifts Faria with the power of electricity. According to legend, she is the one who killed Jenius after he burned Granseed's old library to the ground before dying in battle herself, but this was a fabrication. In reality, she witnessed Jenius create the Book of Time in order to prevent the power of destruction from spreading and only allowed the lies about Jenius to be remembered because the seal on the Book of Time was imperfect. Even in her spirit form, she is infected with a curse that crystallized part of her right arm. She agrees to help Faria discover the truth about Jenius and the old library but warns her that Faria's life will be in danger, as well.

 A Successor working for Physis and member of the Sons of Destruction. She is a homunculus created to control the soul of Irene and possesses the power of electricity. At first, she loses control of her power, but Irene fully bonds her soul with Reda, allowing her to survive and join Nemo's side to fight Germain. She is horrified upon learning that Germain created her and her fellow homunculi to be disposable pawns in his plans and never really cared for them, and so she chooses to help the Seven Knights defeat him. After that, however, she goes into hiding, until she crosses paths with Faria and believes Faria will try to arrest her. During their battle, Reda digs deeper into Irene's power and manifests a sword with the power of fire. Ultimately, Faria spares her life and they both agree to stop Sophitia. In the final battle, she helps the Seven Knights defend Granseed from Sophitia's monster form and she is accepted as a new student.

 Leader of Physis. He used to be an important figure in the empire until he lost faith in the world and humanity and took control of Physis. By destroying silver hourglasses, mystical artifacts that can control the flow of time, throughout the continent, he has absorbed their power and gained the ability to control time, as well. As the Seven Knights storm his fortress, he nearly overpowers them, but Eren, a fellow temporal mage, nullifies his powers, allowing Nemo to defeat him. He is finally destroyed by Sophitia, the true leader of Physis, who reveals she has been manipulating him for her own plans of destruction.

 A Successor working for Physis and member of the Sons of Destruction. He is a homunculus created to control the soul of Dellons Snolde Black Scythe and possesses enormous physical strength. He later loses control of his power and gets killed by Nemo and Shirley.

 A Successor working for Physis and member of the Sons of Destruction. He is a homunculus created to control the soul of Mercure and possesses the power of black magic. He loses control of his power and begs Germain to save him, only to be betrayed and killed by his own leader.

Librarian of Granseed Academy. A kind woman who helps and gives advice to heroes. Joe admires her very much. After Germanin was defeated by Nemo, it is revealed that Sophitia is the true leader of Physis, who was manipulating Germain the entire time, with the goal of bringing about the end of the world. She originally lived during the age of the original Seven Knights, until she was killed by Jenius, but she survived by transferring her soul into multiple bodies until she could enact her plans of destruction. In her original life, she was acquainted with the original Seven Knights and had feelings for Jenius, but she ultimately felt disappointed that the world did not change, despite the Seven Knights' best efforts, which motivated her plans to merge with the Book of Time and cause global destruction. Nemo and Jenius are barely able to stop her rampage by recreating the Book of Time and sealing her within it.

Anime adaptation
On February 4, 2021, Netmarble announced an anime television series adaptation titled  and produced by Liden Films and DOMERICA. The series is directed by Kazuya Ichikawa, with scripts overseen by Ukyō Kodachi, character designs handled by Arisa Matsuura, and music composed by Yoshiaki Fujisawa. It aired from April 5 to June 21, 2021 on Tokyo MX and other channels. Flumpool performed the series' opening theme song "Freeze", while Daiki Yamashita performed the series' ending theme song "Tail". Muse Communication has licensed the series in South East Asia and the anime is scheduled to be streamed on their YouTube channel. Crunchyroll licensed the series outside Asia.

Other medias
Its characters also appeared in SNK's mobile game developed by Netmarble, The King of Fighters All Star.

References

External links
 
 
 (Seven Knights 2)

2014 video games
Android (operating system) games
Anime television series based on video games
Free-to-play video games
IOS games
Japanese role-playing video games
Liden Films
Netmarble games
Tokyo MX original programming
Video games developed in South Korea